Habiganj-3 is a constituency represented in the Jatiya Sangsad (National Parliament) of Bangladesh since 2008 by Md. Abu Zahir of the Awami League.

Boundaries 
The constituency encompasses Habiganj Sadar and Lakhai upazilas.

History 
The constituency was created in 1984 from a Sylhet constituency when the former Sylhet District was split into four districts: Sunamganj, Sylhet, Moulvibazar, and Habiganj.

Members of Parliament

Elections

Elections in the 2010s

Elections in the 2000s 

Shah A. M. S. Kibria was assassinated on 27 January 2005. Abu Lais Md. Mubin Chowdhury of the BNP was elected unopposed in April, after the four other candidates withdrew from the by-election scheduled for later that month.

Elections in the 1990s

References

External links
 

Parliamentary constituencies in Bangladesh
Habiganj District